The Red Bull RB12 is a Formula One racing car designed by Red Bull Racing to compete in the 2016 Formula One season.

Design

Summary 
The car appears to be quite similar to its predecessor, the Red Bull RB11, while sporting a new livery introduced before the start of the season. This was the last Red Bull car with fuel and lubricants from Total — ending their eight-year partnership.

Livery 
Ricciardo and Verstappen competed in the Austrian Grand Prix in special lederhosen-style competition suits.

Competition history

In the season-opening , both Kvyat and Ricciardo performed well in all three practice sessions. In qualifying, Kvyat qualified a disappointing 18th following mechanical problems with his car, and Ricciardo went on to qualify 8th. In the race, Kvyat failed to start the race due to an electrical problem, meanwhile Ricciardo set the fastest lap and went on to finish the race in fourth.

Ricciardo made it to Q3 and qualified in 5th, almost one and a half seconds behind pole sitter Lewis Hamilton. During the race, Kvyat had contact with Nico Hülkenberg on the first lap but was able to finish 7th, one lap behind winner Nico Rosberg. Ricciardo finished 4th, over a minute behind Rosberg.

During the race, Ricciardo charged off the line to take the lead of the race from Rosberg. Kvyat charged up the inside of Sebastian Vettel in turn one, causing him to collide with Ferrari teammate Kimi Räikkönen. Ricciardo kept the lead until his left-rear tyre failed during lap 3 on the long straight between turns 13 and 14. Kvyat climbed his way to a 3rd-place finish, while Ricciardo had a great recovery drive to secure 4th.

The mirror bounced into and out of the cockpit, causing quite a bit of distraction. Regardless of the distraction, Ricciardo moved onto Q3 and qualified 6th, but was elevated to 5th due to a five-place grid penalty assessed to Vettel for a change of his gearbox. Kvyat, after barely making it into Q3, was able to qualify 8th. At the start of the race, Kvyat struck the rear of Vettel's Ferrari SF16-H braking for turn one, sending him into Ricciardo, causing all three cars damage. Then, during the long left handed turn three, Kvyat struck Vettel again from behind, sending Vettel into the outside wall at great speed. Kvyat was assessed a ten-second stop-and-go penalty for the contact with Vettel. Both Kvyat and Ricciardo's races were ruined by the first lap incidents. Ricciardo was able to finish 11th, while Kvyat only managed to finish 15th.

Verstappen qualified 4th, half of a second slower than Ricciardo, who qualified 3rd. On the first lap of the race, exiting the long right handed turn three, Hamilton and Rosberg collided, causing both to exit the race with damage. A safety car was deployed, with Ricciardo leading the race with Verstappen right behind him. Ricciardo went with a safer three stop strategy, while Verstappen went onto the riskier two stop strategy. At the end of the different strategies, Ricciardo finished 4th, while Verstappen was able to stay out ahead of the two Ferrari drivers, making him the youngest ever race winner and first Dutch race winner in Formula One.

In Q1, Verstappen clipped the inside barrier in turn fifteen with his front right tire, breaking the steering linkage, pitching the car into the outside barrier of turn sixteen. Ricciardo qualified 1st, securing his first ever pole position, three-tenths of a second faster than 2nd place Rosberg. Verstappen had to apply to the stewards for permission to start the race because he failed to set a qualifying time within the 107% rule. Verstappen elected to start the race from pit lane in front of Felipe Nasr, who also failed to set a time within the 107% rule. The race started behind the safety car due to wet conditions. After the safety car came in, Ricciardo was able to build a thirteen-second gap ahead of Hamilton. Ricciardo came into the pits to switch to intermediate tyres, while Hamilton stayed on the extreme wet weather tyres. Ricciardo was able to reduce the gap to Hamilton to half of a second. Hamilton pitted for dry weather tyres, with Ricciardo following suit the next lap, lap 31. Ricciardo's pit crew did not have tyres ready to put onto his car, resulting in a very long stop, narrowly handing the lead to Hamilton. Ricciardo finished the race in 2nd. After the start of the race, Verstappen was able to fight his way into the top ten. On lap 34, Verstappen crashed into the barriers, retiring himself from the race.

Since the 2016 Austrian Grand Prix, the team replaced Ferrari as the best of the rest behind Mercedes, often challenging Mercedes for race victories and finished on the podium at every race except Italy and Abu Dhabi. This was partly due to Verstappen's arrival at the team in Spain which caused Ricciardo to be pushed much more by Verstappen than he was by Kvyat, Ricciardo stating he has learnt from Verstappen's driving techniques in order to improve as a driver. At the 2016 Malaysian Grand Prix, the team achieved their first 1–2 in the V6 hybrid era, the first time it has happened since 2013 Brazilian Grand Prix, the last race of the V8 era. This came after both Mercedes drivers encountered issues throughout the race: Nico Rosberg was spun at the start of the race, while Hamilton suffered a dramatic explosion of his Mercedes engine whilst leading comfortably. Therefore, Ricciardo was able to achieve his first race win in  more than 2 years, while Verstappen came in 2nd.

At the 2016 Brazilian Grand Prix, Verstappen and Ricciardo qualified fourth and sixth respectively. In a rain inflicted race, Verstappen barely managed to avoid hitting the guardrail when he spun on the main straight. After an additional tyre change from intermediates back to rain tyres, he ran in 15th place with just 16 laps remaining. He then made several overtakes in the closing laps to eventually finish on the podium in third place. He received considerable praise for his performance, with his team principal Christian Horner calling it "one of the best drives I've seen in Formula 1".

Complete Formula One results
(key) (results in bold indicate pole position; results in italics indicate fastest lap)

References

External links

 The RB12 on Red Bull Racing's official website

Red Bull Formula One cars
2016 Formula One season cars